The Finland–Russia border barrier is under construction in Finland on the Finland–Russia border. Finland decided to build the border barrier in 2022 due to the 2022 Russian invasion of Ukraine. Its construction began in Imatra on 28 February 2023.

See also
 Finland–Russia relations
 Finnish Border Guard

References

Border barriers
Barrier
2020s establishments in Finland
21st-century fortifications
Buildings and structures in South Karelia
Buildings and structures under construction in Finland
Fortifications in Finland
Imatra
Reactions to the 2022 Russian invasion of Ukraine